Sir Ralph Hare, 1st Baronet (24 March 1623 – 28 February 1672) of Stow Bardolph, Norfolk was an English politician who sat in the House of Commons  variously between 1654 and 1672.

Hare was the son of Sir John Hare and his wife Elizabeth Coventry, only daughter of Thomas Coventry, 1st Baron Coventry by his 1st wife Sarah Sebright. He related to (great great great uncle) Sir Nicholas Hare, Speaker of the House of Commons from 1539 to 1540, who had purchased the Stow Bardolph estate in 1553. Hare was created a baronet, of Stow Bardolph in the County of Norfolk on 23 July 1641 and appointed Sheriff of Norfolk for 1650.

He was elected Member of Parliament for Norfolk in the First Protectorate Parliament in 1654, and then re-elected MP for Norfolk for the Second Protectorate Parliament in 1656. In 1660, he was elected MP for King's Lynn in the Convention Parliament and MP for Norfolk in 1661 for the Cavalier Parliament, sitting until his death in 1672.
 
Hare died at the age of 48. He had married firstly Mary Crane, daughter of Sir Robert Crane, 1st Baronet  of Chilton, Suffolk, by whom he had seven children, of whom Thomas succeeded him. He married secondly, Vere Townshend, daughter of Sir Roger Townshend, 1st Baronet of Raynham,  Norfolk, but by her had no issue. He married thirdly Elizabeth Chapman of Suffolk, and by that lady left a posthumous son, John, who died in infancy.

References

1623 births
1672 deaths
People from Stow Bardolph
High Sheriffs of Norfolk
English MPs 1654–1655
English MPs 1656–1658
English MPs 1660
English MPs 1661–1679
Baronets in the Baronetage of England
Members of the Parliament of England for Norfolk